The 2006–07 season was Swindon Town's first season in the League Two since the 1980s. Alongside the league campaign, Swindon Town will also competed in the FA Cup, League Cup and the Football League Trophy.

League Two

Sponsors

Pre-season

Copa Ibiza

Domestic friendlies

Wiltshire Premier Shield

League Two

August

The FA Cup

FA Cup results

The League Cup

League Cup results

The Football League Trophy

Football League Trophy results

Matchday squads

League Two line-ups 

1 1st Substitution, 2 2nd Substitution, 3 3rd Substitution.

FA Cup line-ups 

1 1st Substitution, 2 2nd Substitution, 3 3rd Substitution.

League Cup line-ups 

1 1st Substitution, 2 2nd Substitution, 3 3rd Substitution.

Football League Trophy line-ups 

1 1st Substitution, 2 2nd Substitution, 3 3rd Substitution.

Squad statistics

Appearances and goals

|-
|}

Managerial stats

Goalscorers

Clean sheets

Includes all competitive matches.

Awards

Overall summary

Summary

References 

Swindon Town F.C. seasons
Swindon Town F.C.